Octapharma AG, founded in 1983, is a family-owned pharmaceutical company, and bills itself as "one of the largest human protein manufacturers in the world, developing and producing human proteins from human plasma and human cell lines[3]."

Therapeutic Areas
Patients in 118 countries are treated with products in the following therapeutic areas:  
 Haematology: high-purity coagulation factor concentrates for patients with bleeding disorders Haemophilia A, B and von Willebrand Disease.
 Immunotherapy: immunomodulation or immunoglobulin replacement therapy for the treatment of immune-mediated diseases and deficiencies (immune disorders including autoimmune diseases and antibody deficiency) by inducing, enhancing, or suppressing an immune response. 
 Critical Care: human plasma and protein products for treating critically ill or injured patients in intensive care and emergency medicine settings.

History 
Octapharma was founded in 1983. In the name Octapharma, the “octa” is derived from the Greek word for eight, named after the factor which is deficient in haemophilia A patients. Octapharma's inaugural product was the first Factor VIII concentrate using what was then innovative solvent detergent virus inactivation technology.

The underlying principle of Octapharma's R&D is the development of therapies based on human proteins either purified from human plasma or produced by recombinant technologies applied to human cell lines.

Products 

Octapharma medicines treat a broad range of rare and life-threatening congenital and acquired diseases and conditions:

- bleeding disorders (hemophilia A / B and VWD)
- over 300 types of primary and secondary immune deficiencies
- numerous auto-immune and neurological disorders
- acute conditions
- critical care issues (including trauma and burn victims)
- cancer patients
- major surgeries
- protection of new-borns in case of Rh negative pregnancies

Production 
Octapharma converts source plasma into plasma protein products through fractionation and processing. Each therapy created is controlled, fractionated, purified, virus-inactivated and inspected before being used.

As of December 31, 2022, Octapharma employs around 10,000 people worldwide to support the treatment of patients in 118 countries with products across three therapeutic areas: Hematology, Immunotherapy and Critical Care. Octapharma has seven R&D sites and five state-of-the-art manufacturing facilities in Austria, France, Germany and Sweden, and operates more than 190 plasma donation centers across Europe and the US.

Notes and references

See also 
 List of pharmaceutical companies
 Pharmaceutical industry in Switzerland

External links 

 
 Octapharma Plasma, Inc. Website

Pharmaceutical companies of Switzerland
1983 establishments in Switzerland